Rasm is an Arabic writing script often used in the early centuries of Classical Arabic literature (7th century – early 11th century AD). Essentially it is the same as today's Arabic script except for the big difference that the Arabic diacritics are omitted. These diacritics include i'jam (إِعْجَام, ʾIʿjām), consonant pointing, and tashkil (تَشْكِيل, tashkīl), supplementary diacritics. The latter include the ḥarakāt (حَرَكَات) short vowel marks—singular: ḥarakah (حَرَكَة). As an example, in rasm, the five distinct letters  are indistinguishable because all the dots are omitted. Rasm is also known as Arabic skeleton script.

History 

In the early Arabic manuscripts that survive today (physical manuscripts dated 7th and 8th centuries AD), one finds dots but "putting dots was in no case compulsory". The very earliest manuscripts have some consonantal diacritics, though use them only sparingly. Signs indicating short vowels and the hamzah are largely absent from Arabic orthography until the second/eighth century. One might assume that scribes would write these few diacritics in the most textually ambiguous places of the rasm, so as to make the Arabic text easier  to  read. However, many scholars have noticed that this is not the case. By focusing on the few diacritics that do appear in early manuscripts, Adam Bursi "situates early Qurʾān manuscripts within the context of other Arabic documents of the first/seventh century that exhibit similarly infrequent diacritics. Shared patterns in the usages of diacritics indicate that early Qurʾān manuscripts were produced by scribes relying upon very similar orthographic traditions to those that produced Arabic papyri and inscriptions of the first/seventh century." He concludes that Quranic scribes "neither 
'left out' diacritics to leave the text open, nor 'added' more to clarify it, but in most cases simply wrote diacritics where they were accustomed to writing them by habit or convention."

Rasm means 'drawing', 'outline', or 'pattern' in Arabic.  When speaking of the Qur'an, it stands for the basic text made of the 18 letters without the Arabic diacritics which mark vowels (tashkīl) and disambiguate consonants (i‘jām).

Letters 
The Rasm is the oldest part of the Arabic script; it has 18 elements, excluding the ligature of lām and alif. When isolated and in the final position, the 18 letters are visually distinct. However, in the initial and medial positions, certain letters that are distinct otherwise are not differentiated visually. This results in only 15 visually distinct glyphs each in the initial and medial positions.

  This character may not display correctly in some fonts. The dot should not appear in all four positional forms and the initial and medial forms should join with following character. In other words the initial and medial forms should look exactly like those of a dotless bāʾ while the isolated and final forms should look like those of a dotless nūn.
  There is no hamzah in rasm writing, including hamzah-on-the-line (i.e., hamzah between letters).

These signs, collectively known as ‘alāmātu-l-ihmāl, are still occasionally used in modern Arabic calligraphy, either for their original purpose (i.e. marking letters without i‘jām), or often as purely decorative space-fillers. The small ک above the kāf in its final and isolated forms  was originally ‘alāmatu-l-ihmāl, but became a permanent part of the letter. Previously this sign could also appear above the medial form of kāf, instead of the stroke on its ascender.

Examples

Among the historical examples of Rasm script are the Kufic Blue Qur'an and the Samarkand Qurʾan. The latter is written almost entirely in Kufic rasm.

The following is an example of Rasm from Surah Al-Aʿaraf (7), Ayahs 86 & 87, in the Samarkand Qur'an:

Digital examples 

Note that when rasm is written with spaces, spaces do not only occur between words. Within a word, spaces also appear between adjacent letters that are not connected, and this type of rasm is old and not used lately.

 The sentence may not display correctly in some fonts. It appears as it should if the full Arabic character set from the Arial font is installed; or one of the SIL International fonts Scheherazade or Lateef; or Katibeh.

Examples of Common Phrases

See also
Kufic
Abjad numerals
History of the Arabic alphabet
Qiraʾat
Modern Arabic mathematical notation
Book Pahlavi, an Iranian script with similar graphemic convergence.

References

External links
Some pages from the famous Saint Petersburg-Samerkand-Tashkent Koran. The fourth to seventh images are written in the Kufic script
A page in the earliest script , known as ma'il

Quranic orthography
Arabic words and phrases